Jack Bibby is a professional rugby league footballer who plays as a  for the Huddersfield Giants in the Betfred Super League.

He previously played for the Wigan Warriors in the Super League and spent time on loan from Wigan at Oldham in the Betfred Championship and Betfred League 1, as well as Workington Town in League 1.

In August 2022 Bibby made his Super League début for the Warriors against Hull Kingston Rovers.

In October 2022 Bibby joined the Huddersfield Giants on a three-year deal.

References

External links
Wigan Warriors profile

2001 births
Living people
English rugby league players
Huddersfield Giants players
Oldham R.L.F.C. players
Rugby league props
Wigan Warriors players
Workington Town players